Goodliffe is a surname. People with that name include:

 Ben Goodliffe, professional footballer at Sutton United
Guy Goodliffe (1883-1963), cricketer and British Army officer
 Mark Goodliffe, English puzzler, co-founder of the YouTube channel Cracking the Cryptic
 Michael Goodliffe (1914-1976), English actor

See also
 Goodliffe's Abracadabra, a British weekly magic magazine 1946-2009